Jorge Saralegui is a Cuban film producer and screenwriter. He graduated from Antioch College.

Filmography
He was a producer in all films unless otherwise noted.

Film

As writer

Thanks

References

Cuban film producers
Cuban screenwriters
Male screenwriters
Year of birth missing (living people)
Living people